Anticla flavaria is a moth in the family Bombycidae. It was described by Pieter Cramer in 1781. It is found in the Neotropical realm.

References

Bombycidae
Moths described in 1781